"That's the Way It Is" is the lead single from Celine Dion's greatest hits album All the Way... A Decade of Song, released on 1 November 1999. It peaked within the top ten in many countries, like Austria, Belgium, Canada, Finland, France, Germany, Greece, Hungary, Italy, the Netherlands, New Zealand, Sweden, Switzerland, and the United States. Billboard listed it as one of the Greatest Songs of 1999.

Production and release
It was written and produced by Swedish producers Andreas Carlsson, Max Martin and Kristian Lundin, who had written a string of hit songs for artists such as NSYNC, Backstreet Boys and Britney Spears.

Composition
"That's the Way It Is" starts out in the key of E major with a moderate tempo of 93 beats per minute.  Throughout the verses, the song follows a chord progression of Cm–A–B, and Dion's vocals span from B3 to E5.

The song has a bridge, and after the bridge is the chorus repeated, only in the key of A major.

Live performances
Dion sang it live with NSYNC, during her 1999 CBS Special. She also performed "That's the Way It Is" on Top of the Pops on 12 November, the 1999 Billboard Music Awards, the Bambi Awards on 11 December, The Rosie O'Donnell Show on 13 December, The Today Show on 31 December, and on the Let's Talk About Love Tour as the closing song.
When Dion returned to the music scene after her 2 years off in 2002, the song was performed on her promotional tour for the A New Day Has Come album including a second time at The Today Show, The Early Show, and at the concert for World Children's Day.

In 2015 for the first time in 13 years, Dion added the song as an acoustic version and later the full length version in her 2nd Las Vegas residency show Celine at The Colosseum at Caesars Palace in Las Vegas, Nevada. The song was also performed in Dion's 2017 European tour and her 2018 tour. "That's the Way it is" was performed by Dion during her BST Hyde Park concert in London on 5 July 2019. The song is also featured on the Courage World Tour in North America.

Critical reception
Stephen Thomas Erlewine of AllMusic felt that the danceable "That's the Way It Is" works and highlighted it as a standout on All the Way... A Decade of Song. Another editor, Jose F. Promis reviewed the US/South Korea CD maxi single and rated it 3 out 5 stars. He called the song itself a "cheerful pop nugget", the album version a "definitive hit", and the "Metro Club Remix" a "bubbly dance" version of the song. Michael Paoletta from Billboard highlighted it on the album, and called it a "welcome uptempo number". Another editor, Chuck Taylor also praised "That's the Way It Is". He wrote that Dion at last "ups the tempo with the irresistible" first single. According to Taylor, this new track, a joyful ode to holding the faith but allowing love to take its course when it's ready, matches Dion with a new team of collaborators, consistent hitmakers: Max Martin, Kristian Lundin and Andreas Carlsson. "Replete with a festive mandolin and a midtempo beat to bring new heights to her as-ever splendid vocal," this song is "destined to enrapture" top forty and AC the first time through, at last stripping away mainstream radio's gripe that Dion is "too adult". He said that, youthful and yet elegant, and glowing brightly with warmth, the song also represents a bold step forward for Martin, who is best known for his work with chart-topping youth acts. All in all, "That's the Way It Is" is "one of the most compelling radio releases yet" from "one of the core voices of the decade." Can't Stop the Pop stated that the song "doesn't sound like it's trying to be Britney Spears; it sounds like the authentic evolution of a superstar – this is a Celine Dion song through and through – and it's hard to imagine it being performed by anyone else".

Commercial performance
The song became a hit, going to number 1 on the adult contemporary charts in Canada and the United States, reaching the top ten in other countries all over the world. It was Dion's first airplay-only single that charted on the Billboard Hot 100, peaking at number 6, becoming her 10th and last top 10 hit (number 2 on the Billboard Hot 100 Airplay). The commercial single was released nine months later as a double A-side with "I Want You to Need Me", reaching number 62 on the Hot 100 Singles Sales.

It ranked at number 12 on decade-end list of US Billboard Adult Contemporary chart for 2000–2009. The song spent 1 week at number 1 at the top and an eventual 85 weeks or 1 and a half years on the said chart. It became one of the longest-running single in the chart's history.

"That's the Way It Is" was very successful, being certified platinum in Sweden (20,000), gold in Australia (35,000), Belgium (25,000), Germany (250,000) and silver in France (160,000).

According to Billboard, "That's the Way It Is" received the "BDS Certified Spin Award - 500,000 Spins" in August 2006. Since the song was released in November 1999, it has cycled 500,000 times on almost 1,400 radio stations across Canada and the US.

In other media
The song was included later on The Collector's Series, Volume One compilation (2000) and My Love: Essential Collection greatest hits (2008). Several club remixes were created by the Metro. Some pressings of the single included the song "I Met an Angel (On Christmas Day)", a non-album track.

The song features in & Juliet, a musical featuring the songs of Max Martin, where it is sung by the character of Anne Hathaway. On the official London cast soundtrack, it is performed by Cassidy Janson, who originated the role of Anne on the West End.

Music video
The music video for "That's the Way It Is" was directed by Liz Friedlander.  It was produced by Heather Heller and was shot in Los Angeles, California. It premiered on VH1 on 8 November 1999. It was nominated for a MuchMusic Video Award. The video was included on Dion's All the Way... A Decade of Song & Video DVD. The music video, which was uploaded on YouTube on 24 October 2009 reached 100 million views and became Dion's second VEVO certified music video.

Formats and track listings

European/Japanese CD single and UK cassette single
"That's the Way It Is" – 4:01
"I Met an Angel (On Christmas Day)" – 3:20

Australian/European/UK CD single
"That's the Way It Is" – 4:01
"I Met an Angel (On Christmas Day)" – 3:20
"My Heart Will Go On" (Live) – 5:23

UK CD single #2
"That's the Way It Is" – 4:01
"That's the Way It Is" (The Metro Club Remix) – 5:28
"Another Year Has Gone By" – 3:25

European 12" single
"That's the Way It Is" (Album Version) – 4:01
"That's the Way It Is" (Metro Mix Edit) – 3:12
"That's the Way It Is" (Metro Edit) – 3:20
"That's the Way It Is" (The Metro Club Remix) – 5:28

US CD and 12" single
"That's the Way It Is" (Album Version) – 4:01
"That's the Way It Is" (The Metro Club Remix) – 5:28
"I Want You to Need Me" (Thunderpuss Radio Mix) – 4:32
"I Want You to Need Me" (Thunderpuss Club Mix) – 8:09

Charts

Weekly charts

Year-end charts

Decade-end charts

All-time charts

Certifications and sales

Release history

See also
Billboard Year-End Hot 100 singles of 2000
List of Billboard Hot 100 top 10 singles in 2000
List of number-one adult contemporary singles of 1999 (U.S.)

References

External links

1999 singles
1999 songs
Celine Dion songs
Dance-pop songs
Music videos directed by Liz Friedlander
Number-one singles in the Czech Republic
Song recordings produced by Max Martin
Songs written by Andreas Carlsson
Songs written by Kristian Lundin
Songs written by Max Martin
Columbia Records singles
Epic Records singles